Deutscher Fantasy Preis is a literary prize of Germany. From 1992 to 2008 the prize was endowed every fourth year by the city of Passau when it was awarded at the Kongresse der Phantasie (Congress of Fantasy) convention. 

German literary awards
German speculative fiction awards